Anantha Krishna (born 1 February 1991) is a Singaporean cricketer. He played in the 2017 ICC World Cricket League Division Three tournament, and was the leading wicket-taker for Singapore, with ten dismissals in six matches.

In August 2018, he was named in Singapore's squad for the 2018 Asia Cup Qualifier tournament. In October 2018, he was named in Singapore's squad in the Eastern sub-region group for the 2018–19 ICC World Twenty20 Asia Qualifier tournament. Later the same month, he was named in Singapore's squad for the 2018 ICC World Cricket League Division Three tournament in Oman. He was the leading wicket-taker for Singapore in the tournament, with eleven dismissals in five matches.

In July 2019, he was named in Singapore's Twenty20 International (T20I) squad for the Regional Finals of the 2018–19 ICC T20 World Cup Asia Qualifier tournament. He made his T20I debut for Singapore against Qatar on 22 July 2019.

In September 2019, he was named in Singapore's squad for the 2019 Malaysia Cricket World Cup Challenge League A tournament. He made his List A debut for Singapore, against Qatar, in the Cricket World Cup Challenge League A tournament on 17 September 2019. In October 2019, he was named in Singapore's squad for the 2019 ICC T20 World Cup Qualifier tournament in the United Arab Emirates. However, later that month he was ruled out of the tournament due to an injury.

References

External links
 

1991 births
Living people
Singaporean cricketers
Singapore Twenty20 International cricketers
Singaporean people of Tamil descent
Singaporean sportspeople of Indian descent
Southeast Asian Games gold medalists for Singapore
Southeast Asian Games silver medalists for Singapore
Southeast Asian Games medalists in cricket
Competitors at the 2017 Southeast Asian Games